Bruck in der Oberpfalz is a market town in the district of Schwandorf in the Upper Palatinate, Bavaria, Germany.

References

Schwandorf (district)